Melanoma inhibitory activity protein 2 is a protein that in humans is encoded by the MIA2 gene.

References

Further reading